Corey Daniel Sevier (born July 3, 1984) is a Canadian actor. He is perhaps best known for his role on the Fox television series North Shore as Gabriel McKay and as Timmy Cabot in Lassie.

Life and career
Sevier was born in Ajax, Ontario, the son of Lynda and Bruce Sevier. Sevier scored a modelling job at the age of six months, winning a baby beauty pageant. As a child actor, he notably appeared on the Goosebumps television series episodes "A Night in Terror Tower" and "Cry of the Cat". He starred in the movie adaptation of Wilson Rawls' Summer of the Monkeys. As a teenager, he played the role of Timmy Cabot in the 1997-1999 remake of the Lassie TV series, and also the character Dan in the Little Men TV series in 1998 and 1999. In addition, he was the English voice actor for Mega Man Volnutt in the 1998 video game Mega Man Legends. He later starred in the Canadian series 2030 CE as Hart Greyson. He briefly starred in the failed WB series Black Sash before landing his role on North Shore. He starred in the movie Decoys and its sequel Decoys 2: Alien Seduction. He starred opposite Elizabeth Berkley in the made-for-television movie Student Seduction which premiered on Lifetime in 2003. He also starred in the 2006 film Surf School.

Sevier guest-starred on the show Instant Star for a two-episode arc as Hunter, an ex-convict out for revenge. In 2007 he appeared in an episode of The Dresden Files and in the film The Secret. In 2008, he co-starred in A Broken Life, appeared in an episode of Smallville and played a character called Horace Briggs in "Still Waters", an episode of Murdoch Mysteries. Corey played the part of Carter in Ryan Little's 2007 film House of Fears. 

In 2011, he had a brief role in the mythological-adventure movie Immortals in which he played the role of Apollo.

Portraying fisherman Seth Gunderson, Sevier was part of the ensemble cast of Cedar Cove, a Hallmark Channel original series based on the best-selling books by Debbie Macomber.

Filmography

Movies

Television

References

External links
Corey Sevier – official website

1984 births
Living people
Canadian child models
Canadian male child actors
Canadian male film actors
Canadian male television actors
Canadian male voice actors
People from Ajax, Ontario
Male actors from Ontario
20th-century Canadian male actors
21st-century Canadian male actors
Child beauty pageant contestants